Elvira Santamaría also known by the artistic name of Elvira (1929 in La Tablada – July 8, 1999) was acclaimed as a ballet dancer, milonguera and choreographer of Argentine tango. She was known worldwide for her role as a cast member of the show Tango Argentino, aired for the first time in 1983, for which she was nominated with the other ballerinas in 1986 at the Tony Awards for best choreographer. She danced with her husband Virulazo (Jorge Martín Orcaizaguirre), they presented themselves artistically as Virulazo y Elvira.

Biography 
Elvira Santamaría was born in 1929 in La Tablada in the Conurbano de Buenos Aires. In 1959 she casually re-encountered her first boyfriend, Jorge Martín Orcaizaguirre, known as Virulazo, who was known as an Argentino Dancer. She started her life  partnership  for the rest of her life, under the artistic  name Virulazo and  Elvira. Virulazo recorded these moments of dance in the following way:

In the decade of 1960, with the rise of rock, the tango ceased to be a big music genre and dance for young people:

Virulazo and Elvira entonces se dedicaron al juego clandestino, la quiniela, cuando es contactado en 1983 por Juan Carlos Copes para convocarlo a realizar una prueba para un espectáculo de tango que Claudio Segovia y Héctor Orezzoli pretendían estrenar en París: Tango Argentino. Para entonces Virulazo pesaba 126 kilos, tenía 57 años, cinco hijos y seis nietos. El propio Segovia cuando lo vio llegar, miró a Copes con incredulidad. Copes simplemente le dijo:

Years later, Claudio Segovia said of Virulazo and Elvira:

Argentine Tango proved a worldwide success, in addition to promoting the revival of tango everywhere. Virulazo and Elvira participated in all presentations and became global celebrities. In 1985 they presented the show on Broadway, where the entire dance company was nominated for the Tony Award for Best Choreography.

In 1990 Virulazo died, at age 63, due to lung cancer caused by smoking. Ten years later, in 1999, Elvira, died at 70 years of age.

References

Links 
 

 

1929 births
1999 deaths
Argentine ballerinas
Women choreographers
People from Buenos Aires